Hassan Hassanein (1916 – 2 January 1957) was an Egyptian professional golfer.

Hassanein was born in Cairo. He began his golf career as a caddy. He is considered Egypt's greatest professional golfer and played internationally. He died in Cairo at the age of 40 when a kerosene cook stove exploded.

Tournament wins
this list is probably incomplete
1946 Desert Open
1947 Desert Open
1948 Desert Open
1949 Desert Open, Egyptian Open, Italian Open
1950 Desert Open, Egyptian Open
1951 Desert Open, Egyptian Open, Egyptian Match Play Championship, French Open
1952 Desert Open, Egyptian Open
1953 Desert Open
1954 Desert Open
1956 Desert Open

Results in major championships

Note: Hassanein only played in The Open Championship.

"T" = tied

Team appearances
World Cup (representing Egypt): 1955, 1956

External links
Profile

Egyptian male golfers
Sportspeople from Cairo
1916 births
1957 deaths